Natalia Andreevna Perminova (born 14 November 1991) is a Russian badminton player. She represented her country at the 2016 Summer Olympics in Rio de Janeiro, Brazil.

Achievements

European Junior Championships 
Girls' singles

BWF International Challenge/Series (3 titles, 1 runner-up) 
Women's singles

Women's doubles

  BWF International Challenge tournament
  BWF International Series tournament

References

External links 

 
 

1991 births
Living people
Sportspeople from Yekaterinburg
Russian female badminton players
Badminton players at the 2016 Summer Olympics
Olympic badminton players of Russia
Badminton players at the 2015 European Games
European Games competitors for Russia
21st-century Russian women